Elections to Portsmouth City Council took place on Thursday 6 May 2021, alongside other local elections across the country.

The seats contested in this election were last contested in 2016. The election was originally due to take place on 7 May 2020, but was postponed due to the COVID-19 pandemic. One seat from each ward will be up for election.

Background 
Elections to Portsmouth council since 2012 have proven to have volatile and changing results, with eleven of the city’s fourteen wards  voting for different parties each year. Following the 2018 election in Portsmouth, Gerald Vernon-Jackson became leader of the council and has led the council in a minority administration.

Changes between 2019 and 2021 
Immediately after the previous elections, in May 2019, the composition of the council was:

Liberal Democrats: 18
Labour Party: 6
Conservative Party: 16
Independent: 2

In July 2019, a Liberal Democrat councillor, Jeanette Smith, who was elected in 2018 quit the party. She had been a member of the Lib Dems for two years, having previously been a member of the Labour Party.

In September 2019, Jeanette Smith and one of the other independent councillors, Claire Udy, who had run for election as a member of the Labour Party but had quit shortly before the election, after nominations were closed, citing a lack of support from the local party while under investigation by the National Executive Committee, formed a new grouping called the Progressive Portsmouth People group.

In April 2020, Conservative councillor Lee Mason was suspended from the party, after baking a hot cross bun that appeared to have a swastika "emblazoned" on it over Easter. He was reinstated in August 2020.

In June 2020, Conservative councillor Linda Symes was suspended from the party, after appearing to question why there were demonstrations over the murder of George Floyd during the Black Lives Matter protests and yet not over the murder of Lee Rigby or the killing of seven-year-old Emily Jones. Although she insisted she was 'not being racist' and that 'every life matters’. In another post on Facebook, Symes shared a comment about the mayor of London which said: "Because of his ethnicity Khan (Sadiq) will remain Mayor."

As of October 2020, the composition of the council was as follows:

Liberal Democrats: 17
Labour Party: 6
Conservative Party: 15
Portsmouth Progressive People Group: 2
Independent: 2

Results summary

Results by ward
Comparisons for the purpose of determining a gain, hold or loss of a seat, and for all percentage changes, is to the last time these specific seats were up for election in 2016. An asterisk indicates the incumbent councillor.

Baffins

Central Southsea

Charles Dickens

Copnor

Cosham

Drayton and Farlington

Eastney and Craneswater

Fratton

Hilsea

Milton

Nelson

Paulsgrove

St Jude

St Thomas

References

Portsmouth
2021
2020s in Hampshire
May 2021 events in the United Kingdom